The 2019 season is Balestier Khalsa's 24th consecutive season in the top flight of Singapore football and in the Singapore Premier League and the Singapore Cup.

Squad

Sleague Squad

U19 Squad

Coaching staff

Transfer

Pre-season transfer

In

Out

Extension

Retained 

Note 1: Noor Akid Nordin moved to Albirex Niigata (S) despite signing a 2 years contract in 2018.

Promoted

Mid-season transfers

In

Out

Friendly

Pre-Season Friendly

Team statistics

Appearances and goals

Numbers in parentheses denote appearances as substitute.

Competitions

Overview

Singapore Premier League

Singapore Cup

See also 
 2017 Balestier Khalsa FC season
 2018 Balestier Khalsa FC season

References 

Balestier Khalsa FC
Balestier Khalsa FC seasons